The McLaren MP4-19 is a Formula One racing car that was built by McLaren for the 2004 season. The chassis was designed by Adrian Newey, Paddy Lowe, Pat Fry, Mike Coughlan and Peter Prodromou with Mario Illien designing the bespoke Ilmor engine. The car was driven by Kimi Räikkönen and David Coulthard. It was described as a "debugged version" of the ill-fated McLaren MP4-18, but it was not a successful car. The team suffered various problems concerning reliability at the beginning of the season, with eight retirements in the first seven races. These electronic driver aids had been used by the team for the previous three seasons, since the 2001 Spanish Grand Prix. By mid-season, a new car, the MP4-19B, was required. This was an all-new car with a radically redesigned aerodynamic package. The results were immediately positive and gave the team hope of a better end to the season. Coulthard qualified third for the MP4-19B's first race at the French Grand Prix, followed by further points and podiums from both drivers. The upgrade was finally justified when Räikkönen gave the team its only win of the season when he won the Belgian Grand Prix.

For most of the season, the MP4-19 featured a narrow, needle-like nose design first seen on the MP4-18. A wider, flatter nose was trialed at the Italian Grand Prix but was not retained.

The team eventually finished fifth in the Constructors' Championship with 69 points, the team's lowest finish of the McLaren-Mercedes partnership since the 1996 season. McLaren used 'West' logos, except at the Canadian, French and British Grands Prix.

Complete Formula One results
(key) (results in bold indicate pole position)

References

McLaren MP4 19
2004 Formula One season cars